Rás na mBan is an international stage cycle road race for women in Ireland.

It was first run in 2006 and has run annually since.

The event began as a two-day race based in Dublin and became a three-day event in 2008 when it moved to a new base in Sneem, County Kerry.

A further two days were added in 2011 when it became a five-day race with six stages.
The race was based in County Clare from 2013 to 2015. The race then moved to Kilkenny in 2016.

The first winner was Stefanie Gronow of Germany and many notable world championship, Olympic and professional riders have competed with distinction in Rás na mBan including the 2017 winner, Olympic Team Pursuit champion Elinor Barker, the US professional star and 2014 Rás winner Tayler Wiles and 2016 World Road Race Champion and former Rás na mBan Queen of the Mountains Amalie Dideriksen.

History
Rás na mBan began in 2006 as a replacement for a previous two-day international event run by Dublin Wheelers Cycling Club.

The event was promoted by the Women's Commission of Cycling Ireland with Valerie Considine and Louis Moriarty organising the event. Since 2013 the event has been run by the Rás na mBan organising committee chaired by Considine.

The name 'Rás na mBan' means 'Women's Race' in the Irish language and is pronounced Rawss ne Mon.

Rás na mBan Winners

References

External links
 

Cycle races in Ireland
Annual sporting events in Ireland
Sport in County Kilkenny